Royal George may refer to:
 Royal George (East Indiaman), various ships of the British East India Company
 Royal George (locomotive), an early steam locomotive
 Royal George, Tasmania, a village in Australia
 , various ships of the Royal Navy
 Royal George (pub), an historic pub on Eversholt Street in London

See also 
 Royal George Hotel (disambiguation)
 George Royal, a racehorse
 George C. Royal (1921–2016), American microbiologist